Tập Đình (?–?) was a general during the Tây Sơn Rebellion.

Born Li A-chi in Chaozhou, Guangdong, Qing China. He went to Qui Nhơn in 1759, and became a merchant there. After the Tay Son rebellion broke out, he organized an army named Trung Nghĩa Quân (忠義軍, "Loyal Army") to join in the rebellion. He was granted the title Tập Đình Hầu (集亭侯, "Marquess of Tập Đình"), which later became his nick name. The members in this army wore their hair in the Manchu style, though some of them were not Chinese. In battles, they were drunk and bare-chested, and combated bravery.

The army of Trịnh lord marched south in 1775. Tập Đình fought against Trịnh army together with Lý Tài and Nguyễn Nhạc, but was defeated in Cẩm Sa (a place in mordern Hòa Vang District, Quảng Nam Province). After that, Nhạc turned to swear allegiance to Trịnh lord.

Tập Đình was described as "a man showed a propensity for violence, and hard to be controlled". Nhạc regarded him as a big threat and planned to kill him. Noticing this, Tập Đình fled back to Guangdong. Later, he was captured by the Viceroy of Liangguang, and executed.

References

Tây Sơn dynasty generals
Chinese diaspora in Vietnam
People from Chaozhou